Kumbhakarna Singh (r. 1433–1468 CE), popularly known as Maharana Kumbha, was the Maharana of the Kingdom of Mewar in India. He belonged to the Sisodia clan of Rajputs. Rana Kumbha is known for his illustrious military career against various sultanates and patronization of art and music and architecture.

Early life 
Rana Kumbha was born at Madariya, in a Hindu Rajput family of Sisodia clan. Kumbha was a son of Rana Mokal Singh of Mewar by his wife, Sobhagya Devi, a daughter of Jaitmal Sankhla, the Paramara fief-holder of Runkot in the state of Marwar. He was the 48th Rana of Mewar and succeeded Rana Mokal Singh in the year 1433 CE as the ruler of Mewar.

Early period

After being overrun by the armies of Alauddin Khalji at the turn of the 13th century, Mewar had become relatively insignificant. Rana Hammira is credited with casting off the Turkic yoke and establishing the second Guhila dynasty of Chittor in 1335. The title Rana, and later Maharana, were used by rulers of this dynasty.

Rana Hammira's great grandson, Maharana Mokal was assassinated by two brothers (Chacha and Mera) in 1433. Lack of support, however, caused Chacha and Mera to flee and Rana Kumbha ascended the throne of Mewar. Initially, Rana Kumbha was ably assisted by Ranmal (Ranamalla) Rathore of Mandore, together they attacked Malwa and captured the Sultan. However Rana Kumbha had Ranmal assassinated because of his growing power, leading to an enmity between the Sisodia and Rathore clans, which would last for decades. In November 1442, Mahmud Khalji, Sultan of Malwa, commenced a series of attacks on Mewar. In 1442 the Sultan destroyed the Bana mata temple and started for Chittor, however, he was intercepted by the Rana and a battle was fought at Mandalgarh. The first day was a stalemate, however, the next day the Rana made another attack in which the Sultan was defeated and forced to retreat. The Sultan prepared another army and in 1446 he invaded Mewar again, Rana Kumbha attacked the Sultan's army while they were crossing the Banas river and once again defeated the Malwa army.

Struggle with the Sultans of Malwa and Gujarat

Rana Kumbha after consolidating his rule started a campaign to conquer the neighbouring states. He conquered Sambhar, Ajmer, and Ranthambore amongst other regions. He also subjugated the Rajput states of Dungarpur, Bundi, and Kotah. These states had previously paid tribute to the Sultans of Malwa and Gujarat resulting in hostilities between Mewar and the Sultans. Kumbha attacked the sultanate of Nagaur , which was ruled by the relative of the sultan of Gujrat which started a rivalry between the 2 dynasties finally resulting in an all-out war between Mewar and the Sultanates. 

Mahmud Shah Khilji , the Sultan of Malwa attacked Gagron in 1444 and in the 7 day battle that ensued , the Rajputs died fighting and the women committed jauhar and Gagron was captured by the sultanate of Malwa. Mahmud also tried to attack Mandalgarh but was defeated and driven away by the Rajput forces without any success in 1444-1446.

The ruler of Nagaur, Firuz (Firoz) Khan died . This set into motion a series of events that tested Kumbha's mettle as a warrior. Shams Khan (the son of Firuz Khan) initially sought the help of Rana Kumbha against his uncle Mujahid Khan, who had occupied the throne. After becoming the ruler, Shams Khan, refused to weaken his defenses and sought the help of  Ahmad Shah II, the Sultan of Gujarat (Ahmad Shah died in 1442). Angered by this, Kumbha captured Nagaur in 1456, and also Kasili, Khandela and Sakambhari.

In reaction to this, Ahmad Shah II captured Sirohi and attacked Kumbhalmer. Mahmud Khalji and Ahmad Shah II then reached an agreement (treaty of Champaner) to attack Mewar and divide the spoils. Ahmad Shah II captured Abu, but was unable to capture Kumbhalmer, and his advance towards Chittor was also blocked. Rana Kumbha allowed the army to approach Nagaur when he came out, and after a severe engagement, inflicted a crushing defeat on the Gujarat army, annihilating it. Only remnants of it reached Ahmedabad, to carry the news of the disaster to the Sultan.

In 1456 , After Kumbha annexed Nagaur in the North , the sultan of gujrat attacked Mewar and planned to annex Kumbhalgarh, but failed in the attempt. Mahmud Khalji captured Ajmer and in December 1456, conquered Mandalgarh. Taking advantage of Kumbha's preoccupation, Rao Jodha (the son of Ranmal Rathore) captured Mandore. It is a tribute to Rana Kumbha's skills that he was able to defend his kingdom against this multi-directional attack. The death of Qutb-ud-din Ahmad Shah II in 1458, and hostilities between Mahmud Begada (the new ruler of Gujarat) and Mahmud Khalji allowed Rana Kumbha to recapture his lost territories.

Rana Kumbha successfully defended Mewar and expanded his territory at a time when he was surrounded by enemies like Mahmud Khalji of Malwa, Qutbuddin Ahmad Shah II of Gujarat Sultanate, Shams Khan of Nagaur and Rao Jodha of Marwar.

Construction of forts

Kumbha is credited with having worked assiduously to build up the state again. Of 84 fortresses that form the defense of Mewar, 32 were erected by Kumbha. The chief citadel of Mewar, is the fort of Kumbhalgarh, built by Kumbha. It is the highest fort in Rajasthan (MRL 1075m).

Other architecture

The tower, called Vijay Stambha (Tower of Victory), was completed probably between 1458 and 1468, although some sources date it to 1448. The tower is covered with sculptures of Hindu gods and goddesses and depicts episodes from the Ramayana and the Mahabharata.

There are many inscriptions on the Stambha from the time of Kumbha.
 Verse 17: Kumbha is like the mountain Sumeru for the churning of the sea of Malwa.

 Verse 20: He also destroyed other lowly Mleccha rulers (of the neighborhood). He uprooted Nagaur.
 Verse 21: He rescued twelve lakh cows from the Muslim possession and converted Nagaur into a safe pasture for them. He brought Nagaur under the control of the Brahmanas and secured cows and Brahmanas in this land.
 Verse 22: Nagaur was centre of the Mleccha. Kumbha uprooted this tree of evil. Its branches and leaves were automatically destroyed.

The Ranakpur Trailokya-dipaka Jain temple with its adornments, the Kumbhashyam temple and Adivarsha temples of Chittor and the Shantinatha Jain temple are some of the many other structures built during Rana Kumbha's rule.

Contributions in arts and music
Kumbha was himself well versed in veena playing and patronised musicians as well as artists in his court. He himself wrote a commentary on Gita Govinda of Jaidev and an explanation on Chandisatkam. He also wrote treatises on music called "Sageet raj", "Sangeet mimansa"; "Sangeet ratnakar" and "Shudprabandha". He was the author of four dramas in which he used Sanskrit, Prakrit, and local Rajasthani dialects. In his reign, the scholars Atri and his son Mahesa wrote Prashashti on Kirti stambha. He was well versed in Vedas, Upanishad, and Vyakrana.

Death and aftermath

James Tod, a British administrator in Rajputana who is still much lauded but generally considered unreliable by modern historians, mistakenly believed Rana Kumbha to have married Mira Bai. But Kumbha was murdered in 1468 and Mirabai was born in 1498.Thus, it was an error on the part of Tod to think so. Kumbha  was killed  by his son Udaysimha (Udai Singh I), who thereafter became known as Hatyara (Murderer). Udai himself died in 1473, with the cause of death sometimes being stated as a result of being struck by lightning but more likely to have also been murder.

Udai Singh was succeeded not by his son but by another brother, Raimal of Mewar. Raimal sought the help of Sultan of Delhi and a battle ensued at Ghasa in which Sahasmal and Surajmal, the rebel brothers were defeated by Prithviraj, second son of Raimal.

However, Prithviraj could not ascend the throne immediately because Raimal was still alive. Nevertheless, he was chosen as the crown prince, as his younger brother Jaimal was killed earlier, and his elder brother Sangram Singh was absconding since the fight between the three brothers.

Prithviraj was ultimately poisoned and killed by his brother-in-law, whom Prithviraj had beaten up for maltreating his sister. Raimal died of grief a few days later, thus paving way for Sangram Singh to occupy the throne. Sangram Singh, who had, meanwhile, returned from self-exile, ascended the throne of Mewar and became famous as Rana Sanga.

See also
 List of Rajputs

References

Bibliography

Further reading

1468 deaths
Mewar dynasty
15th-century Indian people
Year of birth unknown
Rajput rulers
Indian military leaders
Patricides
Hindu monarchs